Land's End ( or Pedn an Wlas) is a headland and tourist and holiday complex in western Cornwall, England, on the Penwith peninsula about  west-south-west of Penzance at the western end of the A30 road. To the east of it is the English Channel, and to the west the Celtic Sea.

Land's End is the most westerly point of mainland England. However, it is not the westernmost point on mainland Great Britain, as this title narrowly goes to Corrachadh Mòr in the Scottish Highlands.

Geography
The actual Land's End, or Peal Point, is a modest headland compared with nearby headlands such as Pedn-men-dhu overlooking Sennen Cove and Pordenack, to the south. Land's End has a particular resonance because it is often used to suggest distance.

The westernmost promontory at Land's End is known as Dr Syntax's Head. The character Dr Syntax was invented by the writer William Combe in his 1809 comic verse The Tour of Dr Syntax in Search of the Picturesque, which satirised the work of seekers of the "picturesque" such as William Gilpin.   A nearby promontory is called Dr Johnson's Head after Samuel Johnson, who referred to a hypothetical Cornish declaration of independence in his 1775 essay Taxation no Tyranny.

The area around Land's End has been designated part of an Important Plant Area, by the organisation Plantlife, for rare species of flora.

Land's End is a popular venue for rock climbers.

Geology
The cliffs are made of granite, an igneous rock, which means they are resistant to weathering, and have steep cliff faces. There are two varieties of granite represented at Land's End. To the north, at the First and Last House, there is a finer-grained granite with fewer and smaller phenocrysts, and the different granites can be seen from a distance by the smoother weathering of the finer variety. The granite dates to 268–275 million years ago of the Permian period. The contact zone between the Land's End granite pluton and the altered ″country rocks″ is nearby and the Longships Lighthouse, offshore, is built on the country rock.

History
In 1769, the antiquarian William Borlase wrote:
Of this time we are to understand what Edward I. says (Sheringham. p. 129.) that Britain, Wales, and Cornwall, were the portion of Belinus, elder son of Dunwallo, and that that part of the Island, afterwards called England, was divided in three shares, viz. Britain, which reached from the Tweed, Westward, as far as the river Ex; Wales inclosed by the rivers Severn, and Dee; and Cornwall from the river Ex to the Land's-End.

Tourists have been visiting Land's End for over three hundred years. In 1649, an early visitor was the poet John Taylor, who was hoping to find subscribers for his new book Wanderings to see the Wonders of the West. In 1878 people left Penzance by horse-drawn vehicles from outside the Queens and Union hotels and travelled via St Buryan and Treen, to see the Logan Rock. There was a short stop to look at Porthcurno and the Eastern Telegraph Company followed by refreshments at the First and Last Inn in Sennen. They then headed for Land's End, often on foot or horse, because of the uneven and muddy lanes. Over one hundred people could be at Land's End at any one time. At Carn Kez, the First and Last Inn owned a small house which looked after the horses while visitors roamed the cliffs. The house at Carn Kez developed into the present hotel. The earliest part of the house was damaged by the Luftwaffe when a plane returning from a raid on Cardiff jettisoned its remaining bombs. 53 fisherman were injured or killed. In the build-up to D-Day American troops were billeted in the hotel leaving the building in a bad state.

Land's End was owned by a Cornish family until 1982, when it was sold to David Goldstone. In 1987, Peter de Savary outbid the National Trust to purchase Land's End for almost £7 million from David Goldstone. He had two new buildings erected and much of the present theme park development was instigated by him. He sold both Land's End and John o' Groats to businessman Graham Ferguson Lacey in 1991. The current owners purchased Land's End in 1996 and formed a company named Heritage Great Britain PLC. Attractions at the theme park include children's playgrounds and recorded music. Twice a week in August, Land's End hosts 'Magic in the Skies', a night-time firework spectacular with music by British composer Christopher Bond and narrated by actress Miriam Margolyes. Within the complex is the Land's End Hotel.

In May 2012, Land's End received worldwide publicity as the starting point of the 2012 Summer Olympics torch relay.

End to end
Land's End is either the start or finishing point of end to end journeys with John o' Groats in Scotland. One of the earliest was by Carlisle who left Land's End on 23 September 1879, went to John O'Groats House and arrived back at Land's End on 15 December; taking 72 days (exclusive of Sundays); covering . To prove his journey, he kept a log book which was stamped at any Post Office he passed. An early end to end on bicycle was completed by Messrs Blackwell and Harman of Canonbury Bicycle Club. Starting at Land's End they covered  in thirteen days in July/August 1880. Nearly two years later the Hon I Keith-Falconer travelled  from Land's End, in twelve days, 23 hours, on a bicycle.

Greeb
On the south side of Carn Kez the land slopes away to a shallow valley containing a small stream and the former Greeb Farm. In 1879 a derrick was used for hauling seaweed from the beach 40 feet below for use as a soil improver.

Gallery

See also

 Corrachadh Mòr, the most westerly point in Great Britain
 Finisterra
 John o' Groats
 Land's End Airport
 Land's End to John o' Groats
 Lizard Point, southernmost point of mainland England
 Marshall Meadows Bay, northernmost point of England
 Ness Point, easternmost point of England
 Sennen, the nearest village

External links

References

Headlands of Cornwall
Tourist attractions in Cornwall
Sennen